Alfred Kordelin (6 November 1868, Rauma – 7 November 1917, Mommila, Hausjärvi) was a Finnish industrialist, businessman, entrepreneur, and a major philanthropist. Kordelin was one of the richest Finnish entrepreneurs of his time.

Kordelin had little formal education. He was the son of a poor seaman from Rauma. Kordelin invested wisely in the fields of weaving, shipbuilding and metalworking, becoming one of Finland's richest men. Risto Ryti, who later became President of Finland, was Alfred Kordelin's legal advisor and close friend. Kordelin owned the Mommila and Jokioinen manor houses and a steammill in Reposaari. He invested a large amount of money in different companies. He built a summerhouse in Naantali, called Kultaranta. Kultaranta is currently owned by the Government of Finland, and used as the President's summer residence. Kordelin himself spent only one summer at Kultaranta. On 7 November 1917, Kordelin was kidnapped  by a group of Red Guards and was murdered by a Russian sailor in the so-called Mommila skirmish that followed.

Kordelin never married and was childless. Upon his death he bequeathed all his property to a Finnish cultural foundation in his will. With this money the Alfred Kordelin Foundation was later founded. The foundation gives out several million euros annually in grants and awards to promote literature, science, art, and public education in Finland.

He was buried in Rauma on a chapel which was drawn by Finnish architect Lars Sonck.

References

1868 births
1917 deaths
People from Rauma, Finland
Finnish murder victims
Finnish businesspeople
Finnish patrons of the arts